Wyatt Brichacek (born October 23, 2000) is an American racing driver who currently competes in the 2021 Indy Pro 2000 Championship for Jay Howard Driver Development.

Career

Lower formulae
Brichacek began competing in the Formula 4 United States Championship in 2018, taking part in the full season with Jay Howard Driver Development. He signed on for a second season in 2019.

Road to Indy
Brichacek debuted on the Road to Indy in late 2019, taking part in a one-off weekend in the U.S. F2000 National Championship. For 2020, Brichacek embarked upon a full-season drive in the series. The following season, he stepped up to the Indy Pro 2000 Championship. Returning for a sophomore season with Jay Howard Driver Development in 2022, Brichacek began the season by taking top honors in the pre-season test at Homestead-Miami Speedway. Mid-way through his 2022 season, Brichacek switched from Jay Howard Driver Development to Exclusive Autosport at the Road America rounds.

Sports car racing
In 2023, Brichacek began driving for Inter Europol Competition in the Asian Le Mans Series, competing in the LMP3 class.

Racing record

Career summary

* Season still in progress.

Motorsports career results

American open–wheel racing results

U.S. F2000 National Championship

Indy Pro 2000 Championship

* Season still in progress.

Complete Asian Le Mans Series results 
(key) (Races in bold indicate pole position) (Races in italics indicate fastest lap)

References

External links
Wyatt Brichacek at IndyCar.com

2000 births
Living people
American racing drivers
U.S. F2000 National Championship drivers
Indy Pro 2000 Championship drivers
Asian Le Mans Series drivers
United States F4 Championship drivers
People from Noblesville, Indiana
Racing drivers from Indiana
Racing drivers from Indianapolis
Michelin Pilot Challenge drivers